The National Library, Singapore  is the flagship national library of Singapore. A subsidiary of the National Library Board (NLB), it is located on an 11,304–square metre site in Victoria Street within the Downtown Core. It is the country's largest public library.

The library has regional branches throughout the country such as in Jurong, Tampines and Woodlands as well as affiliations with academic and professional libraries. The branch libraries are open to the general public and consist of circulating libraries. The National Library also consists of research libraries, which are also open to the general public.

History
The National Library traces its history back to 1823 with the establishment of the first national public library as suggested by Stamford Raffles, the founder of modern Singapore. It was renamed the Hullett Memorial Library in 1923, co-located with Singapore's first school, Raffles Institution, at a site now occupied by the Raffles City complex. It moved to a separate Library and Museum Building in 1887 under the name of Raffles Library as part of the Raffles Museum, before moving to the Stamford Road premises in 1960 under the name of the National Library of Singapore where it was opened by Yusof Ishak, the first President of Singapore.

Central Public Library
The Central Public Library serves residents around the Kolam Ayer, Whampoa, Jalan Besar, Kampong Glam and Kreta-Ayer-Kim Seng districts, and houses the world's first green library for kids — "My Tree House". The project, opened in May 2013, is steered by green principles in all facets from design, infrastructure and use of sustainable materials, to collection, services and programming.

On 13 June 2022, the Central Public Library was closed for renovations and expected to reopen by mid of 2023.

Lee Kong Chian Reference Library
Previously known as the National Reference Library, the Lee Kong Chian Reference Library adopted its new name after receiving a S$60 million donation from the Lee Foundation, founded by Dr Lee Kong Chian. It occupies 7 storeys (Levels 7-13) at the National Library Building with a floor area of 14,265 square metres. It has a start-up collection of 530,000 print and non-print materials. The Library provides reference services onsite, or via email, sms, telephone and fax. It has a full range of facilities such as access to electronic databases, document delivery service, microfilm, reprography and audio-visual are available. Other facilities at the library include wireless access to the Internet, as well as the use of reading and meeting rooms. Materials from this library cannot be borrowed, but may be consulted on-site.

Current building
The current building, a 16-storey, two-block development situated in the city's Civic District, replaces the old National Library at Stamford Road, which closed on 31 March 2004.

In May 1999, Swan & Maclaren Architects won the tender to design the new National Library.

In March 2000, Minister for National Development Mah Bow Tan announced that that old National Library will be demolished and a new National Library be built on Victoria Street.

In January 2001, Malaysian architect, Ken Yeang, split from the design team from Swan and Maclaren, resulting Swan and Maclaren losing the design contract. Yeang joined architectural firm T. R. Hamzah & Yeang and the firm took over the design contract for the National Library.

The library moved to its new home on 22 July 2005, and was officially opened on 12 November that year by the then President S. R. Nathan. It is the flagship building of the National Library Board, bringing together the core functions of the old library by incorporating a reference library, known as the Lee Kong Chian Reference Library, as well as a public library, the Central Public Library, under one roof.

The building, designed by T.R. Hamzah & Ken Yeang, consists of two 16-storey blocks, with three basements. The blocks are linked by skybridges on every floor. It houses two libraries, the Central Public Library in Basement 1 and the Lee Kong Chian Reference Library from Levels 7 to 13. It also houses the Drama Centre from Levels 3 to 5, which is managed by the National Arts Council. The National Library Board (NLB) headquarters is located on the 14th floor.

On the highest 16th level rooftop, there is a large closed area designed like a bubble called The Pod, used for functions and events. Although not a public viewing gallery, it has a panoramic 360-degree view of the city core and Marina bay area. The plaza on the ground floor has a cafe and is often used as an exhibition space. There are many gardens in the building but only two are opened to the public - the Courtyard on Level 5 and the Retreat on Level 10. There are seven glass elevators elevators for public use. There are escalators on every floor, from Basement 3 to level 14th. The basement carpark has 246 lots. A number of old bricks from the old National Library building has been incorporated into the present building.

Sections 
The main collections found at each level of the National Library Building include:
Level B1 – Central Public Library Collection
Level 7 – Business, Science and Technology Collections
Level 8 – The Arts and Social Sciences Collections
Level 9 – Chinese, Malay and Tamil Collection
Level 10 – Donors' Collections, Asian Children's Collection
Level 11 – Singapore and Southeast Asian Collection. Microfilms. Maps.
Levels 12 and 13 – Rare Materials Collection (limited access, only with permission)

Gallery

See also

 Education in Singapore
 Environmental planning
 Green building
 Green library
 List of national and state libraries
 Sustainable architecture

References 
 Citations

External links

Commemorating the Closing Chapter of the National Library at Stamford Road
National Library Board Singapore
Lee Kong Chian Reference Library
UNLV William F.Harrah College of Hotel Administration
National Library of Singapore's Guide to its history

2005 establishments in Singapore
Downtown Core (Singapore)
Libraries in Singapore
Libraries established in 2005
Library buildings completed in 2005
Singapore